I Like may refer to:
"I Like" (Guy song), 1989
"I Like" (Jeremih song), 2010
"I Like" (Keri Hilson song), 2009
"I Like" (Kut Klose song), 1995
"I Like" (Montell Jordan song), 1996
"I Like" (Pitbull song), 2012
"I Like" (Shanice song), 1994
"I Like", a song by Young Stoner Life featuring Karlae and Coi Leray from the album Slime Language 2
"I Like", a song by Men Without Hats from the album Rhythm of Youth, 1982

See also
I Like It (disambiguation)